Jean Pare (born 24 March 1913, date of death unknown) was a Swiss basketball player. He competed in the men's tournaments at the 1936 Summer Olympics and the 1948 Summer Olympics.

References

External links
 

1913 births
Year of death missing
Swiss men's basketball players
Olympic basketball players of Switzerland
Basketball players at the 1936 Summer Olympics
Basketball players at the 1948 Summer Olympics
Place of birth missing